Fredrik Bild (born 25 June 1974) is a retired Swedish football defender, who played for Östers IF.

He also represented IFK Norrköping in Allsvenskan.

He is the brother of Andreas Bild, son of Per-Olof Bild and grand nephew of Harry Bild.

External links
 

1974 births
Living people
Allsvenskan players
Östers IF players
IFK Norrköping players
Swedish footballers
Association football defenders
Place of birth missing (living people)